Ayatollah Fakhraddin Mousavi Naneh Karani (1930 – 18 September 2021) was an Iranian judge and politician.

Mousavi was born in Ardabil. He was a member of the first, third and fifth Islamic Consultative Assembly from the electorate of Ardabil, Nir, Namin and Sareyn. He was a member of 5th Assembly of Experts from Ardabil Province electorate. He was supported by the People's Experts in the election.

See also

 List of members in the First Term of the Council of Experts
 List of members in the Third Term of the Council of Experts
 List of members in the Fifth Term of the Council of Experts
 List of Ayatollahs

References

1930 births
2021 deaths
People from Ardabil
Deputies of Ardabil, Nir, Namin and Sareyn
Members of the 1st Islamic Consultative Assembly
Members of the 3rd Islamic Consultative Assembly
Members of the 5th Islamic Consultative Assembly
Al-Moussawi family